White Mamba is the nickname of:
 Adam Morrison (born 1984), American basketball player
 Brian Scalabrine (born 1978), American basketball player
 Eli, a fictional character from the video game Metal Gear Solid V: The Phantom Pain
Diana Taurasi (born 1982), American basketball player

See also 
 Mamba (disambiguation)